Bom Conselho ("Good Advice") is a city in northeastern Brazil, in the state of Pernambuco. It lies in the mesoregion of Agreste of Pernambuco and has 786.2 sq/km of total area.

Geography

 State – Pernambuco
 Region – Agreste of Pernambuco
 Boundaries – Saloá and Terezinha (N); Alagoas state (S); Lagoa do Ouro (E); Iati (W).
 Area – 786.2 km2
 Elevation – 654 m
 Hydrography – Ipanema River
 Vegetation – Caatinga Hipoxerófila
 Annual average temperature – 22.0 c
 Distance to Recife – 266 km
 Population - 48,767 (2020)

Economy

The main economic activities in Bom Conselho are related to commerce and agribusiness, especially the raising of cattle, pigs, sheep, and horses, and plantations of sweet potatoes, beans and bananas.

Economic indicators

Economy by sector
2006

Health indicators

References

Municipalities in Pernambuco